Des Pickett (4 June 1925 – 10 June 2016) was an Australian rules footballer who played with St Kilda in the Victorian Football League (VFL).

Notes

External links 

2016 deaths
1925 births
Australian rules footballers from Victoria (Australia)
St Kilda Football Club players